NBC Sports is an American programming division of the broadcast network NBC, owned and operated by NBC Sports Group division of NBCUniversal and subsidiary of Comcast. The division is responsible for sports broadcasts on the network, and its dedicated national sports cable channels. Formerly operating as "a service of NBC News", it broadcasts a diverse array of sports events, including Major League Baseball, the French Open, the Premier League, the IndyCar Series, NASCAR, the National Football League (NFL), Notre Dame Fighting Irish college football, the Olympic Games, professional golf,the Tour de France and Thoroughbred racing, among others. Other programming from outside producers – such as coverage of the Ironman Triathlon – is also presented on the network through NBC Sports. With Comcast's acquisition of NBCUniversal in 2011, its own cable sports networks were aligned with NBC Sports into a part of the division known as the NBC Sports Group.

History

Early years

2000s
In 2000, NBC declined to renew its broadcast agreement with Major League Baseball. In 2002, it was additionally outbid by ESPN and ABC for the National Basketball Association's new broadcast contract, ending the league's twelve-year run on NBC.

During this era, NBC experimented with broadcasting emerging sports. In 2001, the network partnered with the World Wrestling Federation (WWF) to establish the XFL – a new football league which introduced modified rules and debuted to tremendous, but short-lived fanfare, only lasting one season (NBC shared broadcast rights to the league's games, which were mainly held on Saturday nights, with UPN). In 2003, NBC obtained the broadcast rights and a minority interest in the Arena Football League. The network televised weekly games on a regional basis, as well as the entire playoffs. The deal lasted four years, after which the league and NBC parted ways.

Beginning with the 1999 NASCAR Winston Cup Series, NBC began its foray into NASCAR. NBC, along with Fox and TNT, obtained the broadcast rights of the top two series – the NASCAR Cup Series and NASCAR Xfinity Series – in a six-year deal, beginning in 2001. NBC televised the second half of the season and alternated coverage of the Daytona 500 with Fox. In December 2005, NBC announced that it would not renew its agreement with NASCAR. In 2001, NBC obtained the broadcast rights to horse racing's Triple Crown of Thoroughbred Racing in a five-year deal.

In 2004, NBC reached a broadcast agreement with the National Hockey League (NHL). The revenue-sharing deal called for the two sides to split advertising revenue after the network recouped the expenses. Games were supposed to begin airing on the network during the 2004–05 season, however a league lockout that resulted in the cancellation of that season delayed the start of the contract until the second half of the 2005–06 NHL season. NBC televised regular season games at first on Saturday afternoons before moving the telecast to Sundays, Saturday and Sunday afternoon playoff games, and up to five games of the Stanley Cup. Additionally in 2008, NBC broadcast the 2008 NHL Winter Classic, an outdoor NHL game played on New Year's Day at Ralph Wilson Stadium, a success in attendance and television ratings. The following year's Winter Classic would become the most-watched regular season game in 34 years. In addition to this regular season success, Game 7 of the 2009 Stanley Cup Final was watched by an average of 8 million viewers, the highest ratings for an NHL game in 36 years.

The NFL also returned to NBC in 2006 after an eight-year hiatus, broadcasting the league's new flagship Sunday Night Football game, along with select postseason games and Super Bowls XLIII, XLVI, XLIX, LII, LVI and LX.

2010s: Comcast/NBCUniversal era

In January 2011, Comcast finalized its acquisition of a majority share in NBC Universal. As a result of the merger, the operations of Comcast's existing sports networks, such as Golf Channel and NBCSN, were merged into an entity known as the NBC Sports Group. NBC Sports' senior vice president Mike McCarley additionally became Golf Channel's new head. NBC Sports' golf production unit was merged with Golf Channel, along with NBC's on-air staff, with that unit rebranding under the banner "Golf Channel on NBC", while Versus was reformatted toward a more mainstream audience, renamed the NBC Sports Network and eventually rebranded as NBCSN.

The merger also helped influence an extension of NBC Sports' contract with the NHL; the 10-year deal – valued at close to $2 billion, unified the cable and broadcast television rights to the league and introduced a new "Black Friday" Thanksgiving Showdown game on NBC, along with national coverage for every game in the Stanley Cup playoffs. On July 3, 2011, ESPN obtained the exclusive broadcast rights to The Championships, Wimbledon in a 12-year deal, ending NBC's television relationship with The Championships after 42 years.

From 2012 until 2015, Major League Soccer games were shown on NBC and the NBC Sports Network. This included the broadcast of two regular season games, two playoff games, and two national team matches on NBC and 38 regular season games, three playoff games, and two national team matches on NBC Sports Network. Since the 2013–14 season NBC Sports has also held the rights to televise Premier League soccer in English (primarily on NBCSN) and Spanish (on Telemundo and Universo),  through a $250 million deal, replacing ESPN and Fox Soccer as the league's U.S. broadcasters.

NBC Sports held broadcast rights to the Formula One (formerly held by Speed and Fox Sports) from 2013 until 2017. The majority of its coverage (including much of the season, along with qualifying and practice sessions) aired on NBCSN, while NBC aired the Monaco Grand Prix, Canadian Grand Prix and the final two races of the season, which in the first year of the deal included the United States Grand Prix. All races were also streamed online and through the NBC Sports Live Extra mobile app. They lost the broadcast rights to ESPN beginning from the 2018 season.

On March 18, 2013, nearly all of the operations for NBC Sports and NBCSN began to be based out of a purpose-built facility in Stamford, Connecticut. The move was made mainly to take advantage of tax credits given by the state of Connecticut, which NBC has taken advantage of previously with the tabloid talk shows of its NBCUniversal Television Distribution. Only Football Night in America remained in New York City, at NBC Studios, until September 7, 2014, when production of that program also moved to Stamford.

NASCAR returned to NBC Sports properties in 2015 under a ten-year deal, with NBC once again airing the second half of the NASCAR Cup Series and NASCAR Xfinity Series seasons. While no specific financial details were disclosed, NBC reportedly paid 50% more than ESPN and TNT (who took over the portion of the season previously held by NBC) combined under the previous deal.

In May 2015, NBCUniversal announced the formation of NBC Deportes (later renamed Telemundo Deportes), which serves as a Spanish language branch of NBC Sports for Telemundo and NBC Universo.

On June 7, 2015, amid its loss of rights to the USGA's championships to Fox (including the U.S. Open), NBC Sports and The R&A agreed to a twelve-year deal to televise The Open Championship, Senior Open Championship, and Women's British Open on NBC and Golf Channel, beginning in 2017. Existing rightsholder ESPN opted out of its final year of its agreement for the tournaments, with the Open subsequently debuting a year early in 2016.

Universal Sports ceased operations in November 2015. NBCUniversal acquired the rights to the content that was previously held by Universal Sports Network. Much of the programming moved to either Universal HD, NBCSN and NBC Sports Live Extra.

From 2016 until 2018, NBC Sports held the rights to Premiership Rugby, the top division of English rugby union, through a three-year deal. The contract included up to 24 regularly-scheduled games on NBCSN per-season, and up to 50 streaming. Its first live match was on March 12, 2016, when London Irish hosted Saracens F.C. at Red Bull Arena in Harrison, New Jersey.

In June 2016, NBC Sports launched NBC Sports Gold, a suite of sport-specific over-the-top subscription services that would included expanded and overflow coverage of its properties.

On July 15, 2017. NBCUniversal relaunched Universal HD as Olympic Channel, a network that would carry Olympic sports programming as a complement to its long-standing agreement to cover the Games.

In early 2018, it was announced that NBC Sports would renew its contract with the IndyCar Series (continuing a relationship with NBCSN which began in 2009 as Versus), through 2021, and acquire the broadcast television rights previously held by ABC. NBC televises eight races per-season since 2019, including the series flagship Indianapolis 500, with the remaining races airing on NBCSN as before. An IndyCar package is also offered through NBC Sports Gold. Shortly after, NBC announced a six-year agreement with the International Motor Sports Association beginning in 2019, including the WeatherTech SportsCar Championship, with the majority of coverage on NBCSN.

2020s 
Following the launch of NBCUniversal's streaming service Peacock, NBC Sports began to migrate some of its overflow content (including the Premier League and other NBC Sports Gold services) to the service. On June 29, 2020, Fox sold the last seven years of its contract to air USGA tournaments to NBC, regaining rights to the U.S. Open for the first time since 2015.

In January 2021, it was reported that NBCUniversal planned to shut down NBCSN by the end of the year; an internal memo cited increased competition from streaming services and the other mainstream sports networks as reasoning.

NBC's contract with the NHL expired after the 2020–21 season, with the league signing new contracts with ESPN and TNT.

On December 31, 2021, NBCUniversal shut down NBCSN; its remaining programming rights were moved to other NBCUniversal platforms, particularly USA Network and Peacock.

On April 6, 2022, NBC Sports announced a deal to carry a package of Sunday afternoon MLB games on Peacock beginning in the 2022 season. On July 1, 2022, NBC Sports announced that Olympic Channel would shut down as a linear channel on September 30, 2022.

On August 18, 2022, NBC Sports announced a seven-year deal to carry Big Ten Conference college athletics across its platforms beginning in the 2023–24 academic season. This contract will most notably include a new package of primetime Big Ten college football games on NBC beginning in the 2023 season, as well as a package of college basketball and  Olympic sports coverage on Peacock.

Olympics

In 1964, NBC televised the 1964 Summer Olympics in Tokyo; in 1972, NBC televised the 1972 Winter Olympics for the first time. 1980 would prove to be a stinging disappointment for the network; after contentious negotiations, NBC won the broadcast rights to the 1980 Summer Olympics. After the Soviet Union invaded Afghanistan, the United States and 64 other countries boycotted the event. NBC substantially scaled back its coverage and lost heavily in advertising revenue. In 1988, NBC televised the 1988 Summer Olympics in Seoul. Since then, it has branded itself as "America's Olympic Network", televising every Summer Olympic Games since the Seoul event, as well as every Winter Olympic Games since 2002 Winter Olympics. In total, NBC has aired 13 Summer and Winter Olympics, the most by any one U.S. network. The Olympic Games have also become an integral part of the network, despite some recurring controversy over its method of broadcast delaying events in part to take advantage of a wider national audience in prime time.

In 1998, Ebersol was named president of NBC Sports and Olympics.

The 2010 Winter Olympics in Vancouver were watched by a total of 190 million viewers, including 27.6 million viewers of the gold medal game in men's hockey.

During the 2014 Winter Olympics in Sochi, Russia, over 500 hours of the games were broadcast across five NBC-owned television channels (NBC, NBCSN, CNBC, MSNBC and USA Network), with 1,000 hours being streamed digitally. In January, the company announced some exclusive digital-only streaming of the 2014 Olympics via the NBCOlympics.com website and the NBC Sports Live Extra app for Android and iOS, including exclusive content such as Gold Zone, Olympic Ice and NBC's Olympic News Desk.

Branding
With the premiere of Sunday Night Football, NBCUniversal hired Troika Design Group to design an overall visual identity for its coverage, including branding, on-air graphics, and other visual elements.

Concurrent with the relaunch of Versus as NBC Sports Network on January 2, 2012, and the 2012 NHL Winter Classic, NBC Sports also launched a comprehensive redesign of its branding, including a new on-air graphics design built around the NBC peacock, and an updated logo for the division as a whole (replacing a logo that had been in use since 1989). The new design was also intended to be modular, allowing it to be expanded for use in larger events across multiple networks (such as the Super Bowl and the Olympic Games). A refreshed design for on-air graphics was introduced on January 1, 2015 (in time for the 2015 NHL Winter Classic and NFL playoffs), with a cleaner and brighter visual appearance.

NBC began using dedicated graphics packages specifically for Sunday Night Football during Super Bowl LII, and unveiled a second redesign for the 2022 season during Super Bowl LVI. NBC similarly diverged for its Premier League coverage in 2019, adopting elements of its new British sibling Sky Sports.

Programs throughout the years

Current programs
 Major League Baseball on NBC (1947–1989, 1994–2000, 2022–present)
 MLB Sunday Leadoff (2022–present; Peacock will broadcast these games, with NBC carrying the first game.)
 Golf Channel on NBC (1954–present)
 USGA Championships (1954–1965, 1995–2014, 2020–present)
 Ryder Cup (1991–present)
 Presidents Cup (2000–present)
 Senior PGA Championship (1990–present)
 Women's PGA Championship (2015–present)
 The Open Championship (2016–present)
 Senior Open Championship (2016–present)
 Women's British Open (2016–present)
 Olympics on NBC
 Summer Olympics (1964, 1980, 1988, 1992, 1996, 2000, 2004, 2008, 2012, 2016, 2020, 2024, 2028, 2032)
 Winter Olympics (1972, 2002, 2006, 2010, 2014, 2018, 2022, 2026, 2030)
 Thoroughbred Racing on NBC (1949–present)
 Kentucky Derby (2001–present)
 Preakness Stakes (2001–present)
 Breeders' Cup (1984–2005, 2012–present)
 Haskell Invitational Stakes (2014–present)
 Santa Anita Derby (2009–present)
 Pegasus World Cup (2017–present)
 Woodford Reserve Turf Classic (2010–present)
 Ascot Racecourse (2017–present)
 French Open (1983–present)
 College Football on NBC Sports (1946–1965, 1991–present)
 Notre Dame Football on NBC (1991–present)
 Bayou Classic (1991–2014, 2022–present)
 All-American Bowl (2004–present)
 Big Ten Saturday Night (2023–present)
 NFL on NBC (1951–1953, 1955–1964, 1970–1997, 2006–present)
 NBC Sunday Night Football (2006–present)
NFL Wild Card playoff game (2007–present)
NFL Divisional playoff game (2015–present)
 Super Bowl: I (shared with CBS), III, V, VII, IX, XI, XIII, XV, XVII, XX, XXIII, XXVII, XXVIII, XXX, XXXII, XLIII, XLVI, XLIX, LII, LVI, LX, LXIV, and LXVIII
 Football Night in America (2006–present)
 Tour de France (2011–present)
 Premier League on Peacock (2013–present)
 United States Football League (2022–present)
 Pan American Games (2023–present)

Motorsport
 NASCAR on NBC (1979–2006, 2015–present)
 Drone Racing League (2019–present)
 IndyCar Series on NBC (2009–present)
 Indianapolis 500 (2019–present)
 IMSA on NBC (2019–present)
 Rolex 24 at Daytona (2019–present)
 Monster Jam (2019–present)
 AMA Supercross Championship (2019–present)
 MotoGP World Championship (2020–present) 
 Include Moto2 and Moto3 Races 
 Superbike World Championship (2020–present)
 Include WorldSSP and WorldSSP300 Races

Olympic sports
 ISU Grand Prix of Figure Skating (2004–present)
 U.S. Figure Skating Championships (2008–present)
 FINA World Aquatics Championships
 World Athletics Championships
 Diamond League
 World Men's Handball Championship (2019–present)
 USA Swimming
 USA Track & Field
 Four Continents Figure Skating Championships
 FIS Alpine Ski World Cup
 Bobsleigh World Cup
 Skeleton World Cup
 Fencing World Cup
 FINA Diving World Cup
 FIVB Beach Volleyball World Tour
 World Marathon Majors

Rugby
 Rugby World Cup (2011, 2015, 2019, 2023)
 English Premiership (2016–present)
 Six Nations Championship (2018–present)

Other
 National Dog Show (2001–present)
 WWE Raw (1993–2000, 2005–present)
 WWE NXT (2010, 2019–present)

Former programs
 Major League Baseball on NBC
 World Series ( (Games 1 & 5), –,  (Games 2, 3, & 6))
 Major League Baseball Game of the Week (1956–1989)
 Major League Baseball: An Inside Look (1979–1989)
 The Baseball Network (1994–1995)
 NBC College Football Game of the Week
 Rose Bowl Game (1952–1988)
 Sugar Bowl (1959–1969)
 Orange Bowl (1965–1995)
 Fiesta Bowl (1978–1995)
 Cotton Bowl Classic (1953–1957, 1993–1995)
 Gator Bowl (1996–2006)
 Outback Bowl (1988–1992)
 Citrus Bowl (1984–1985)
 Army–Navy Game (1945–1953, 1955–1959, 1964–1965)
 Blue–Gray Football Classic (1958–1963)
 NBA on NBC (1954–1962; 1990–2002)
 WNBA on NBC (1997–2002)
 2002 FIBA World Championship
 NFL on NBC
 National Football League (1955–1963, 1970–1997)
 American Football League (1965–1969)
 AFC games (1970–1997)
 Thursday Night Football (2016–2017)
 The NFL on NBC pregame show
 Grandstand (1975–1976)
 NFL 77, 78 (1977–1986)
 NFL Live! (1987–1994)
 NFL on NBC (1995–1997)
 NHL on NBC: (1966, 1972–1975, 1990–1994 (All Star Game), 2005–2021)
 College Basketball on NBC (1969–1998)
 NCAA Division I men's basketball tournament (1969–1981)
 The Championships, Wimbledon (1969–2011)
 Sportsworld (1978–1992)
 Champ Car World Series (1979–1990, 1994, 2005–2007)
 WWF/E Saturday Night's Main Event (1985–1992, 2006–2008)
 American Le Mans Series (1999–2004, 2007–2008)
 Formula One (2013–2017)
 Titans-RX (2014–2017)
 Gillette Cavalcade of Sports (1946–1960)
 Michael Jordan Celebrity Golf Classic (1990s)
 Soccer
 FIFA World Cup (1966, 1986)
 MLS on NBC (2012–2014)
 Superstars (1985–1990)
 XFL (2001)
 AFL on NBC (2003–2006)
 CFL on NBC (1954, 1982, 2012–2013)
 Professional Bowlers Association (1984–1991)
 Association of Volleyball Professionals (1990–2009)
 Hambletonian Stakes (2007–2012)
 Premier Boxing Champions (2015–17)
 NASCAR on NBC
 2002, 2004, and 2006 Daytona 500 Extreme Championship Wrestling (2006–2010)
 WWE SmackDown (2010–2019)
 Premier Lacrosse League (2019–2021)
 Belmont Stakes (1950–1952, 2001–2005, 2011–2022)

Notable personalities

Present

Play-by-play
 NBC Sunday Night Football – Mike Tirico, Al Michaels
 NBC Olympic broadcasts – Dan Hicks, Leigh Diffey, Ted Robinson, Bob Fitzgerald, Terry Gannon, Kenny Albert, Steve Schlanger, Todd Harris, Paul Burmeister. Bill Spaulding, Jim Kozimor, Jason Knapp, Kenny Rice
 MLB Sunday Leadoff - TBD
 NASCAR on NBC – Rick Allen, Leigh Diffey, Dave Burns, Dale Earnhardt Jr.
 IndyCar Series on NBC – Leigh Diffey, Kevin Lee
 IMSA on NBC –  Leigh Diffey, Rick Allen, Brian Till, Kevin Lee, Dave Burns
 Tennis on NBC – Dan Hicks
 Golf Channel on NBC – Dan Hicks, Mike Tirico, Terry Gannon, Steve Sands
 Big Ten Saturday Night – Noah Eagle
 Notre Dame Football on NBC – Jac Collinsworth
 Premier League on NBC – Peter Drury, Joe Speight
 World Athletics/USA Track & Field – Paul Swangard, Leigh Diffey
 FINA/USA Swimming/USA Diving – Dan Hicks, Ted Robinson
 Rugby World Cup – Rupert Cox
 Tour de France – Phil Liggett
 USFL – Jac Collinsworth, Paul Burmeister

Color commentators
 NBC Sunday Night Football – Cris Collinsworth, Tony Dungy, Jason Garrett, Terry McAulay
 NASCAR on NBC – Steve Letarte, Jeff Burton, Dale Earnhardt Jr., Dale Jarrett, Parker Kligerman, Brad Daugherty
 IndyCar Series on NBC – Townsend Bell, James Hinchcliffe
 IMSA on NBC – Dale Earnhardt Jr., Calvin Fish, Townsend Bell, James Hinchcliffe 
 Tennis on NBC – John McEnroe, Mary Carillo
 Golf Channel on NBC – Paul Azinger, Gary Koch, Justin Leonard
 Big Ten Saturday Night – Todd Blackledge, Terry McAulay
 Notre Dame Football on NBC – Jason Garrett, Terry McAulay
 Premier League on NBC – Lee Dixon, Graeme Le Saux, Tim Howard, Robbie Earle, Robbie Mustoe, Danny Higginbotham, Stephen Warnock
 IAAF/USA Track & Field – Ato Boldon, Sanya Richards-Ross, Craig Masback
 FINA/USA Swimming/USA Diving – Rowdy Gaines, Elizabeth Beisel, Michael Phelps, Cynthia Potter
 Tour de France – Bob Roll
 USFL – Jason Garrett, Michael Robinson, Cameron Jordan

Reporters
 NBC Sunday Night Football – Melissa Stark, Kaylee Hartung
 Olympics on NBC – Andrea Joyce, Heather Cox, Kelli Stavast, Trenni Kusnierek, Lewis Johnson, Steve Sands, Tina Dixon
 MLB Sunday Leadoff – Ahmed Freed
 NASCAR on NBC – Marty Snider, Kelli Stavast, Dave Burns, Parker Kligerman, Kim Coon, Dillon Welch
 IndyCar Series on NBC – Marty Snider, Kelli Stavast, Kevin Lee, Dillon Welch, Dave Burns
 IMSA on NBC – Marty Snider, Kelli Stavast, Dave Burns, Parker Kligerman, Kevin Lee, Brian Till, Dillon Welch
 Golf Channel on NBC – Roger Maltbie, Mark Rolfing, Notah Begay III, Kathryn Tappen
 Big Ten Saturday Night – Kathryn Tappen
 Notre Dame Football on NBC – Zora Stephenson
 World Athletics/USA Track & Field – Lewis Johnson, Todd Harris
 FINA/USA Swimming/USA Diving – Ahmed Fareed, Laura Wilkinson, Kelli Stavast
 Tour de France – Steve Porino, Jens Voigt
 USFL – Corey Robinson, Zora Stephenson

Studio hosts
 Football Night in America – Maria Taylor, Jac Collinsworth
 Olympics on NBC – Mike Tirico, Rebecca Lowe, Jimmy Roberts, Kathryn Tappen, Ahmed Fareed, Maria Taylor
 MLB Sunday Leadoff - Ahmed Fareed
 NASCAR on NBC – Marty Snider
 IndyCar Series on NBC – Mike Tirico
 Golf Channel on NBC – Jimmy Roberts
 Notre Dame Football on NBC – Kathryn Tappen
 Premier League on NBC – Rebecca Lowe, Ahmed Fareed, Paul Burmeister, Cara Banks, Anna Jackson
 National Dog Show – John O'Hurley
 Tour de France – Paul Burmeister
 USFL – Sara Perlman

Studio analysts
 Football Night in America – Tony Dungy, Jason Garrett, Mike Florio, Rodney Harrison, Chris Simms, Steve Kornacki, Matthew Berry
 NASCAR on NBC – Kyle Petty, Dale Jarrett, A. J. Allmendinger, Brad Daugherty
 IndyCar Series on NBC – Danica Patrick, Dale Earnhardt Jr., A. J. Allmendinger
 Premier League on NBC – Robbie Mustoe, Robbie Earle, Tim Howard, Danny Higginbotham
 Tour de France - Christian Vande Velde, Chris Horner

Emeritus
Al Michaels

Former

Play-by-play
 Thursday Night Football - Al Michaels, Mike Tirico
 Major League Baseball on NBC – Mel Allen, Bob Costas, Dick Enberg, Joe Garagiola, Curt Gowdy, Bryant Gumbel, Lindsey Nelson, Vin Scully, Bob WolffMLB Sunday Leadoff - Jason Benetti
 NBA on NBC - Greg Gumbel, Dick Enberg, Don Criqui, Mike Breen, Bob Neal, Curt Gowdy, Dan Hicks, Paul Sunderland, Jim Lampley
 NHL on NBC – Tim Ryan, Mike Emrick, Dave Strader, Chris Cuthbert, Kenny Albert, Mike Tirico, John Forslund, Gord Miller, Brendan Burke, Randy Hahn, Rick Peckham, Alex Faust
 NASCAR on NBC – Bill Weber, Allen Bestwick
 IndyCar Series on NBC – Bob Jenkins, Brian Till, Bob Varsha
 IMSA on NBC – Allen Bestwick, Bill Weber
 MLS on NBC – John Strong, Steve Cangialosi, Richard Fleming
 Thoroughbred Racing on NBC – Tom Durkin
 Notre Dame Football on NBC – Don Criqui, Dick Enberg, Tom Hammond, Dan Hicks
 SportsWorld – Paul Page
 The Championships, Wimbledon – Dick Enberg
 Formula One – Leigh Diffey, Bob Varsha
 Premier League on NBC - Steve Bower, Derek Rae, Clive Tyldesley, Bill Leslie, Arlo White

Color commentators
 NFL on NBC – Merlin Olsen, Paul Maguire, Phil Simms, Bob Trumpy, Len Dawson, Al DeRogatis
 NBC Sunday Night Football – John Madden
 Thursday Night Football - Cris Collinsworth, Doug Flutie, Tony Dungy, Kurt Warner
 Major League Baseball on NBC – Joe Morgan
 NBA on NBC – Bill Walton, Matt Guokas, Doug Collins, Quinn Buckner, Tom Tolbert, Dan Issel, Chuck Daly, Cotton Fitzsimmons, Julius Erving, Steve "Snapper" Jones
 NHL on NBC – Ted Lindsay, Bill Clement, John Davidson, Eddie Olczyk, Pierre McGuire, Brian Engblom, Brian Hayward, Peter McNab, Joe Micheletti, A. J. Mleczko, Mike Johnson, Kendall Coyne Schofield, Peter McNab, Jim Fox
 NASCAR on NBC – Benny Parsons, Wally Dallenbach Jr., James Hinchcliffe,
 IndyCar on NBC – Robbie Buhl, Jon Beekhuis, Wally Dallenbach Jr., Dan Wheldon, Sam Hornish Jr., David Hobbs, Steve Matchett, Anders Krohn, James Hinchcliffe, Paul Tracy,
 MLS on NBC – Brian Dunseth, Stuart Holden, Shep Messing, Robbie Russell
 Golf Channel on NBC – Johnny Miller
 Notre Dame Football on NBC – Pat Haden, Mike Mayock, Drew Brees
 College Basketball on NBC – Al McGuire, Billy Packer
 Formula One – David Hobbs, Steve Matchett
 Tour de France – Paul Sherwen

Reporters
 NBC Sunday Night Football – Andrea Kremer, Alex Flanagan, Michele Tafoya, Kathryn Tappen
 Thursday Night Football – Heather Cox
 Major League Baseball on NBC – Bob Costas
 NBA on NBC – Jim Gray
 NASCAR on NBC – Bill Weber, Allen Bestwick, Matt Yocum, Mike Massaro, Alex Hayden, Jim Noble, Lindsay Czarniak, Dorsey Schroeder
 NHL on NBC – Pierre McGuire, Brian Boucher, Ray Ferraro, Cammi Granato, Darren Pang
 IndyCar Series on NBC – Jack Arute, Michelle Beisner, Calvin Fish, Robbie Floyd, Gary Gerould, Brian Hammons, Bruce Jenner, Sally Larvick, Cameron Steele, Bill Stephens, Lindy Thackston, Anders Krohn, Robin Miller
 Olympics on NBC – Melissa Stark, Lesley Visser, Chris Wragge, Craig Sager, Marty Snider
 Notre Dame Football on NBC – Lewis Johnson, Alex Flanagan
 The Championships, Wimbledon – Bud Collins
 French Open – Bud Collins
 Formula One – Will Buxton, Townsend Bell

Studio hosts
 NFL on NBC – Gayle Gardner, Bryant Gumbel, Greg Gumbel, Jim Lampley, Bob Costas
 NBC Sunday Night Football – Bob Costas, Dan Patrick, Keith Olbermann, Liam McHugh, Mike Tirico
 Thursday Night Football – Mike Tirico, Bob Costas, Dan Patrick, Liam McHugh
 Major League Baseball on NBC – Bill Macatee
 NBA on NBC – Hannah Storm
 NHL on NBC – Bill Clement, Pierre McGuire, Bob Costas, Dan Patrick, Liam McHugh, Kathryn Tappen, Mike Tirico, Ahmed Fareed, Paul Burmeister, Russ Thaler
 Olympics on NBC – Bob Costas, Dick Enberg, Gayle Gardner, Curt Gowdy, Bryant Gumbel, Greg Gumbel, Jim Lampley, Dan Patrick, Alex Flanagan, Liam McHugh
 NASCAR on NBC – Bill Weber, Brian Williams, Krista Voda
 IndyCar Series on NBC – Kevin Lee, Krista Voda
 MLS on NBC – Russ Thaler
 Notre Dame Football on NBC – Hannah Storm, Liam McHugh
 Premier League – Steve Bower, Russ Thaler, Liam McHugh, Derek Rae, Arlo White

 Studio analyst 
 NBC Sunday Night Football - Sterling Sharpe, Cris Collinsworth, Jerome Bettis, Tiki Barber, Hines Ward, Drew Brees
 NHL on NBC – Eddie Olczyk, Keith Jones, Patrick Sharp, Anson Carter, Mike Babcock, Dominic Moore, Ryan Callahan, Ray Ferraro, Mike Milbury, Jeremy Roenick, Brett Hull
 Notre Dame Football on NBC'' – Doug Flutie, Corey Robinson
 Premier League – Kyle Martino

Telemundo personalities
 Andrés Cantor
 Ana Jurka

Presidents and chairmen
 Chet Simmons (1977–1979)
 Arthur Watson (1979–1989)
 Dick Ebersol (1989–2011)
 Ken Schanzer (1998–2011) 
 Jon Miller (2011–present)

Main competitors

 CBS Sports – sports division of Paramount Global
 ESPN Inc. – joint venture between The Walt Disney Company and Hearst Communications
 Fox Sports – sports division of Fox Corporation
 Stadium – joint venture between Sinclair Broadcast Group and Chicago White Sox
 Warner Bros. Discovery Sports – sports division of Warner Bros. Discovery

References

External links
 

 
1946 establishments in New York City
Mass media companies established in 1946
National Broadcasting Company